is a Japanese professional shogi player, ranked 9-dan. He is a Lifetime Meijin who won the title eight times, and also a former Ryūō, Kiō and Ōshō title holder. He is also a former senior managing director of the Japan Shogi Association.

Early life
Moriuchi was born on October 10, 1970, in Yokohama. His grandfather was shogi professional , who died about ten years before Moriuchi was born. When Moriuchi was young and would visit his grandmother's house, she would show him old issues of Shogi World that she had kept, and this is when Moriuchi first became interested in shogi.

Moriuchi started playing in shogi tournaments as an elementary school student and it was there that his rivalry with Yoshiharu Habu began. Habu lived in neighboring Tokyo and was the same age, so the two often participated in the same tournaments. Moriuchi even went to watch Habu win a tournament whose entry was limited to Tokyo residents only. The following year, Moriuchi defeated Habu in the finals of the same tournament after it had been changed to an open tournament allowing anyone to participate.

In 1982, Moriuchi finished tied for third in the 7th . Both Moriuchi and Habu advanced to the semi-finals held in Tokyo which were broadcast on television. Moriuchi, however, lost his semi-final game, whereas Habu won his and then subsequently the final to become the "7th Elementary School Shōgi Meijin". That same year, Moriuchi entered the Japan Shogi Association's apprentice school with the rank of 6-kyū as a protegee of shogi professional . He was awarded professional status and the rank of 4-dan in May 1987.

Shogi professional
In 1987, Moriuchi won his first professional shogi tournament when he defeated  2 games to none to win the 18th , but was unable to repeat as champion the following year when he lost the 19th Shinjin-Ō to Habu 2 games to none in the first match between the two as professionals. Moriuchi would, however, win the tournament again in 1991 (against Taku Morishita, 20) and 1993 (against Yasumitsu Satō, 21).

In 1988, Moriuchi defeated then Meijin Koji Tanigawa 2 games to 1 to win the 7th . The victory was a much discussed through the year in professional shogi circles because Moriuch ranked 4-dan at the time had defeated the reigning Meijin in a match. Tanigawa would get his chance for revenge against Moriuchi in 19th All Nihon Pro Tournament final in 2000, but was defeated 3 games to 2.

Moriuchi's first appearance in a major title match was the 54th Meijin Match in June 1996. Moriuchi was promoted to the Class A League for the first time in 1995 and went on to win the league in his first season with a 72 record to advance to the title match against Habu. Although both players were the same age and had been rivals since elementary school, Habu was much more establish as a professional and was also a 7-crown title holder (i.e., simultaneously held all seven major titles) at the time. Moriuchi ended up losing the matchi 41.

Moriuchi became the fifteenth shogi professional to win 800 official games when he defeated Yoshiharu Habu in Game 2 of 69th Meijin title match on April 21, 2011.

In March 2017, Moriuchi voluntarily declared himself as a free class player, thus leaving the Meijin tournament league.

Playing style

Moriuchi is considered an all-around player proficient at both Static Rook and Ranging Rook strategies. Although he's widely known as defensively strong player, his style often called "iron-clad" or "steel defense"; in the opinion of shogi professionals Hirotaka Nozuki and Akihito Hirose, however, his most characteristic trait is his ability to switch from defense to attack. His so-called "strong" style is often contrasted with the "gentle" one of Yoshiharu Habu.

Moriuchi is also well known for the Moriuchi Fortress variation which is characterized by pushing the pawn at the ninth file with P. 9d instead of the traditional P-8e, followed then by a knight jump to 9-c and then 8e.

Promotion history
The promotion history for Moriuchi is as follows:
 6-kyū: 1982
 1-dan: 1985
 4-dan: May 13, 1987
 5-dan: June 2, 1990
 6-dan: April 1, 1992
 7-dan: April 1, 1994
 8-dan: April 1, 1995
 9-dan: May 17, 2002

Titles and other championships
Moriuchi has appeared in major title matches a total of 25 times. He has won the Meijin title eight times, thus qualifying for the Lifetime Meijin title. He has also won the Ryūō title twice, and the Kiō and the Ōshō titles once each. In addition to major titles, Moriuchi has won thirteen other shogi championships during his career.

Major titles

Other championships

Note: Tournaments marked with an asterisk (*) are no longer held.

Year-end shogi prize money and game fee ranking
Moriuchi has finished in the "Top 10" of the JSA's  twenty-one times since 1993, and in the "Top 3" nine of those times.

Note: All amounts are given in Japanese yen and include prize money and fees earned from official tournaments and games held from January 1 to December 31.

Awards and honors
Moriuchi has received a number of awards and honors throughout his career for his accomplishments both on an off the shogi board. These include awards given out annually by the JSA for performance in official games as well as other JSA awards for career accomplishments, and awards received from governmental organizations, etc. for contributions made to Japanese society.

Annual Shogi Awards
16th Annual Awards (April 1988March 1989): Best New Player
19th Annual Awards (April 1991March 1992): Best Winning Percentage, Most Games Won, Most Games Played, Distinguished Service Award
21st Annual Awards (April 1993March 1994): Technique Award
24th Annual Awards (April 1996March 1997): Technique Award
29th Annual Awards (April 2001March 2002): Fighting-spirit Award
30th Annual Awards (April 2002March 2003): Technique Award
31st Annual Awards (April 2003March 2004): Player of the Year, Most Games Won, Most Games Played
33rd Annual Awards (April 2005March 2006): Excellent Player
38th Annual Awards (April 2010March 2011): Game of the Year Special Prize
41st Annual Awards (April 2013March 2014): Player of the Year

Other awards
2004: Shogi Honor Award (Awarded by the JSA in recognition of winning 600 official games as a professional)
2011: Shogi Honor Fighting-spirit Award (Awarded by JSA in recognition of winning 800 official games as a professional)
2012:  25 Years Service Award (Awarded by the JSA in recognition of being an active professional for twenty-five years)
2017: Medal with Purple Ribbon: (Awarded by the Government of Japan to individuals who have done meritorious deeds or have achieved excellence in their profession)

JSA director
Moriuchi was selected to be the senior managing director of the Japan Shogi Association's board of directors for a two-year term at the association's 68th General Meeting on May 29, 2017. In April 2019, he announced that he would not seek re-election when his term expired in June 2019.

Other board games

Moriuchi also plays chess and backgammon. He been playing in chess tournaments since 1998, and his chess Elo score is 2310 (FIDE Master level) .

In August 2014, he tied for fourth in the 39th Backgammon World Championship held in Monte Carlo.

References

External links
  
 Japan Shogi Association official profile page 
 ShogiHub: Professional Player Info · Moriuchi, Toshiyuki
 World Chess Federation (FIDE) official chess profile page
 Chess Database profile page
 YouTube: 森内俊之の森内チャンネル

1970 births
Japanese shogi players
Living people
Professional shogi players
Backgammon players
Japanese chess players
Game show contestants
People from Yokohama
Professional shogi players from Kanagawa Prefecture
Recipients of the Medal with Purple Ribbon
Meijin (shogi)
Ryūō
Kiō
Ōshō
Lifetime titles
Free class shogi players
Shogi YouTubers
Japanese YouTubers
Shinjin-Ō
Ginga